Andreas Jonathan Willi  (born 17 December 1972 in Altstätten) is a Swiss linguist, philologist, and classicist. He is currently the Diebold Professor of Comparative Philology at the University of Oxford and a professorial fellow of Worcester College, Oxford. In 2020, he was elected a Fellow of the British Academy. In 2019, Willi was awarded the Humboldt Prize.

Academic career
Willi studied Classics and Slavonic Languages and Literature at the University of Basel (lic.phil. in 1997), and comparative philology at the Universities of Lausanne, Michigan, and Fribourg (lic.phil in 1998). He completed a doctoral degree at the University of Oxford in 2001 with a thesis on The languages of Aristophanes: aspects of linguistic variation in Classical Attic Greek under the supervision of Anna Morpurgo Davies. During his time at Oxford, he was a member of Corpus Christi College. He was called to the chair of comparative philology at Oxford in 2005.

Selected publications

References 

Swiss philologists
living people
Linguists from Switzerland
1972 births